The 2000 Asian Junior Women's Volleyball Championship was held in Dagupan, Philippines, from 12 September to 17 September 2000.

Pools composition
The teams are seeded based on their final ranking at the 1998 Asian Junior Women's Volleyball Championship.

Preliminary round

Pool A

|}

|}

Pool B

|}

|}

Final round
 The results and the points of the matches between the same teams that were already played during the preliminary round shall be taken into account for the final round.

Classification 5th–8th

|}

|}

Championship

|}

|}

Final standing

Awards
Best Server:  Ai Otomo
Best Libero:  Megumi Kawashima

External links
 www.jva.or.jp

A
V
V
Asian women's volleyball championships
Sports in Pangasinan
Asian Junior